Marina Nemat (born 22 April 1965) is the author of two memoirs about her life growing up in Iran, serving time in Evin Prison for speaking out against the Iranian government, escaping a death sentence and finally fleeing Iran to go and live in Canada.

Life
Nemat's grandmothers were both Russian, and she was brought up in a Russian Orthodox Christian family in Tehran. Both her grandmothers had, with their Iranian husbands whom they had married before the Russian Revolution of 1917, fled from Russia to Iran as part of the massive wave of migration that had started. Her father worked as a dance teacher, her mother as a hairdresser. She was a high school student when the secularizing monarchy of Mohammad Reza Pahlavi was overthrown by Ayatollah Khomeini's Islamic Revolution. As a student Marina Nemat opposed the oppressive policies of the new Islamic government, attended demonstrations and wrote anti-revolutionary articles in a student newspaper.

On 15 January 1982, at age 16, Nemat was arrested and imprisoned for her views against the revolution. She was tortured in the notorious Evin Prison well known for atrocities against political inmates, and sentenced to death. She was rescued by a prison guard, who also obtained commutation of her sentence to life imprisonment. However, after five months of imprisonment, it became clear that Ali had developed an attachment to Nemat and intended to force her to marry him. Nemat did eventually marry the guard and was released from prison; he was later assassinated.

Nemat later married Andre Nemat. They escaped to Canada in 1991 and have two sons. Nemat worked at the Aurora franchise of the Swiss Chalet restaurant chain, and wrote her life story in 78,000 words. She knew that many victims did not want to talk about their fate.

Today, Nemat teaches memoir writing part-time at the University of Toronto School of Continuing Studies, and regularly speaks about her experiences in front of high-school classes, universities, libraries and associations. She is a regular participant in the Oslo Freedom Forum. In 2012 she was a guest speaker at the San Francisco Freedom Forum of the Human Rights Foundation along with Aung San Suu Kyi and Garry Kasparov.

She is a graduate of the certificate program in creative writing at the School of Continuing Studies at the University of Toronto.

Marina sits on the Board of Directors at the CCVT (Canadian Centre for Victims of Torture) and Vigdis, a Norwegian charitable organization that provides legal and other forms of assistance to female political prisoners around the world. In addition, she is the chair of the Writers in Exile Committee at PEN Canada, a member of the International Council of the Oslo Freedom Forum, and has been a volunteer at her church’s Refugee Committee since 2010.

Memoirs
Her book Prisoner of Tehran has been published by 27 publishing houses around the world and has been an international best seller (2012). In April 2012, a theatre adaptation of the book was staged at the Theatre Passe Muraille in Toronto under the direction of Maja Ardal.  In 2014, Nemat also collaborated with Motus O dance theatre to create a multi-disciplinary work based upon the memoir consisting of "a combination of the spoken word, movement, video and music." In November 2016 the production was performed at the Canadian Museum for Human Rights.

She was an Aurea Fellow at Massey College at the University of Toronto in 2008/2009, where she authored her second book, After Tehran: A Life Reclaimed, which was released in 2010.

Bibliography
 Prisoner of Tehran: a memoir (2006). New York: Free Press. 
 After Tehran: a life reclaimed (2010). Toronto: Penguin Canada. 
 The Best Canadian Essays 2017 by Marina Nemat, Deni Ellis Béchard, Matt Cahill, et al.

Awards
 Marina Nemat was awarded the first Human Dignity Prize in December 2007. This prize is to be given annually by the European Parliament and the Cultural Association Europa 2004. The Human Dignity Prize "celebrates organizations and individuals working for a world free from intolerance and social injustice, a world where fundamental human rights are respected."
The Prize Committee said that Nemat was chosen "because of her strength of character despite her life experiences."

 In 2014, she was awarded the Morris Abram Human Rights Award by UN Watch in Geneva, Switzerland.

References

Sources

McLeans, "Once Upon a time in Evin": https://web.archive.org/web/20160309210534/https://business.highbeam.com/4341/article-1G1-164326859/once-upon-time-evin-one-woman-account-her-years-iran

External links

 Official site 
Interview with Marina Nemat on CBC's "The Next Chapter"
Interview with Marina Nemat in Haaretz the Israeli daily newspaper by correspondent of the Dutch daily newspaper Trouw, Ina R. Friedman.
 Wildman, Sarah. (6 January 2008). "Caught in the Ayatollah’s Web". New York Times. Review.

Iranian writers
Iranian prisoners and detainees
Iranian emigrants to Canada
Iranian people of Russian descent
Russian Orthodox Christians from Iran
Canadian people of Russian descent
Iranian women writers
People from Tehran
Writers from Toronto
1965 births
Living people
Prisoners and detainees of Iran
Canadian women non-fiction writers
Canadian non-fiction writers
Iranian torture victims
Exiles of the Iranian Revolution in Canada